Allegheny County is a county in Pennsylvania, United States. It is located in Southwestern Pennsylvania. As of the 2020 census, the population was 1,250,578, making it the state's second-most populous county, after Philadelphia County. Its county seat is Pittsburgh.
Allegheny County is part of the Pittsburgh, PA metropolitan statistical area and the Pittsburgh media market.

Allegheny was the first county in Pennsylvania to be given a Native American name. It was named after the Lenape word for the Allegheny River. The meaning of "Allegheny" is uncertain. It is usually said to mean "fine river". Stewart says that the name may come from a Lenape account of an ancient mythical tribe called "Allegewi", who lived along the river before being taken over by the Lenape.

History

Prior to European contact, this area was settled for thousands of years by succeeding cultures of indigenous peoples. During the colonial era, historic native groups known by the colonists to settle in the area included members of western nations of the Iroquois, such as the Seneca; the Lenape, who had been pushed from the East by European-American settlers; the Shawnee, who also had territory in Ohio; and the Mingo, a group made up of a variety of peoples from more eastern tribes.

European fur traders such as Peter Chartier established trading posts in the region in the early eighteenth century.

In 1749, Captain Pierre Joseph Céloron de Blainville claimed the Ohio Valley and all of western Pennsylvania for King Louis XV of France. The captain traveled along the Ohio and Allegheny rivers. He installed lead plates in the ground to mark the land for France.

Most of the towns during that era were developed along waterways, which were the primary transportation routes, as well as providing water for domestic uses. Through the eighteenth century, both the French and the British competed for control over the local rivers in this frontier territory of North America. Native American bands and tribes allied with the colonists to differing degrees, often based on their trading relationships. The British sent Major George Washington to expel the French from their posts, with no success. He also nearly drowned in the ice-filled Allegheny River while returning to camp.

The English tried again in 1754 to establish a post in the area. They sent 41 Virginians to build Fort Prince George. The French learned of the plan and sent an army to capture the fort. They resumed building it and added increased defensive fortification, renaming it as Fort Duquesne.

Given its strategic location at the Ohio, Fort Duquesne became an important focal point of the French and Indian War. The first British attempt to retake the fort, the Braddock Expedition, failed miserably. In 1758  British forces under General John Forbes recaptured the fort; he had it destroyed to prevent any use by the French. The British built a new, larger fort on the site, including a moat, and named it Fort Pitt. The historic site has been preserved as Pittsburgh's Point State Park.

Under their colonial charters, both Pennsylvania and Virginia claimed the region that is now Allegheny County. Pennsylvania administered most of the region as part of its Westmoreland County. Virginia considered everything south of the Ohio River and east of the Allegheny River to be part of its Yohogania County, and governed it from Fort Dunmore. In addition, parts of the county were located in the proposed British colony of Vandalia and the proposed U.S. state of Westsylvania. The overlapping boundaries, multiple governments, and confused deed claims soon proved unworkable. Near the end of the American Revolutionary War, in 1780 Pennsylvania and Virginia agreed to extend the Mason–Dixon line westward. This region was assigned to Pennsylvania. From 1781 until 1788, much of what Virginia had claimed as part of Yohogania County was administered as a part of the newly created Washington County, Pennsylvania.

Allegheny County was officially created on September 24, 1788, from parts of Washington and Westmoreland counties. It was formed to respond to pressure from the increase in settlers living in the area around Pittsburgh; this was designated as the county seat in 1791. The county originally extended north to the shores of Lake Erie; it was reduced to its current borders by 1800. As population increased in the territory, other counties were organized.

In the 1790s, the United States federal government imposed a whiskey excise tax. Farmers who had depended on whiskey income refused to pay and started the so-called Whiskey Rebellion after driving off tax collector John Neville. After a series of demonstrations by farmers, President George Washington sent troops to suppress the frontier rebellion.

The area developed rapidly through the 1800s with industrialization. It became the nation's prime steel producer by the late 19th century and Pittsburgh was nicknamed "Steel Capital of the World".

In 1913, the county's 125th anniversary was celebrated with a week-long series of events. The final day, September 27, was marked by a steamboat parade of 30 paddle wheelers. They traveled from Monongahela Wharf down the Ohio to the Davis Island Dam. The boats in line were the Steel City (formerly the Pittsburgh and Cincinnati packet Virginia), the flag ship; City of Parkersburg, Charles Brown, Alice Brown, Exporter, Sam Brown, Boaz, Raymond Horner, Swan, Sunshine, I. C. Woodward, Cruiser, Volunteer, A. R. Budd, J. C. Risher, Clyde, Rival, Voyager, Jim Brown, Rover, Charlie Clarke, Robt. J. Jenkins, Slipper, Bertha, Midland Sam Barnum, Cadet, Twilight, and Troubadour.

On October 27, 2018 during a Sabbath course and a Torah study a domestic terrorist attack occurred at the Tree of Life – Or L'Simcha Congregation killing 12 people and harming eight others, marking it one of the deadliest terrorist attacks in Pennsylvania history.

Geography

Three major rivers traverse Allegheny County: the Allegheny River and the Monongahela River converge at Downtown Pittsburgh to form the Ohio River. The Youghiogheny River flows into the Monongahela River at McKeesport,  to the southeast. There are several islands in these courses. The rivers drain via the Mississippi River into the Gulf of Mexico. Although the county's industrial growth resulted in clearcutting of the area's forests at one time, there has been regrowth and a significant woodland remains.

Adjacent counties
Butler County (north)
Armstrong County (northeast)
Beaver County (northwest)
Westmoreland County (east and south)
Washington County (southwest)

Major roads and highways

Climate
Allegheny has a humid continental climate which is hot-summer, (Dfa) except in higher elevations, where it is warm-summer (Dfb).

Law and government

Until January 1, 2000, Allegheny County's government was defined under Pennsylvania's Second Class County Code. The county government was charged with all local activities, including elections, prisons, airports, public health, and city planning. All public offices were headed by elected citizens. There were three elected county commissioners.

On January 1, 2000, the Home-Rule Charter went into effect. It replaced the three elected commissioners with an elected chief officer (the County Executive), a county council with 15 members (13 elected by district, two elected county-wide), and an appointed county manager. The changes were intended to maintain a separation of powers between the executive and legislative branches while providing greater citizen control.

The county has 130 self-governing municipalities, the most in the state. (Luzerne is second with 76). The county has one Second Class City (Pittsburgh) and three Third Class Cities (Clairton, Duquesne, and McKeesport).

A 2004 study found the county would be better served by consolidating the southeastern portion of the county (which includes many small communities with modest economies) into a large municipality ("Rivers City") with a combined population of approximately 250,000.

County Executive
 Rich Fitzgerald (D)

County Council

 Bethany Hallam (D), At-large
 Tom Baker (R), District 1
 Suzanne Filiaggi (R), District 2
 Anita Prizio (D), District 3
 Patrick Catena (D), President, District 4
 Tom Duerr (D), District 5
 John F. Palmiere (D), District 6
 Nicholas Futules (D), District 7
 Paul Zavarella (D), District 8
 Robert J. Macey (D), Vice President, District 9
 DeWitt Walton (D), District 10,
 Paul Klein (D), District 11
 Robert Palmosina (D), District 12
 Olivia Bennett (D), District 13
 Samuel DeMarco III (R), At-large

Other elected county offices

 Controller, Corey O'Connor (D) 
 District Attorney, Stephen A. Zappala Jr. (D)
 Sheriff, Kevin M. Kraus (D)
 Treasurer, John K. Weinstein (D)

Politics
 

|}

 there were 939,382 registered voters in the county; a majority were Democrats. There were 534,214 registered Democrats, 264,193 registered Republicans, 98,958 registered as independents and 42,017 registered with other parties.

The Republican Party had been historically dominant in county-level politics in the 19th and early 20th centuries; prior to the Great Depression, Pittsburgh and Allegheny County had been majority Republican. Since the Great Depression on the state and national levels, the Democratic Party has been dominant in county-level politics. It is by far the most Democratic county in western Pennsylvania. For much of the time between the Great Depression and the turn of the millennium, it was the second-strongest Democratic bastion in Pennsylvania, behind only Philadelphia.

In 2000, Democrat Al Gore won 56% of the vote and Republican George W. Bush won 41%. In 2004, Democrat John Kerry received 57% of the vote and Republican Bush received 41%. In 2006, Democrats Governor Ed Rendell and Senator Bob Casey, Jr. won 59% and 65% of the vote in Allegheny County, respectively. In 2008, Democrat Barack Obama received 57% of the vote, John McCain received 41%, and each of the three state row office winners (Rob McCord for Treasurer, Jack Wagner for Auditor General, and Tom Corbett for Attorney General) also carried Allegheny. In 2016, despite Donald Trump being the first Republican to carry Pennsylvania since 1988, Hillary Clinton did slightly better than Barack Obama's 2012 vote total while Donald Trump was the worst performing Republican in 20 years. In the 2018 Midterms, Democrats received an even higher percentage of the vote with Tom Wolf and Bob Casey receiving approximately two thirds of the county's vote. This is an improvement over the approximately 55% each person received in the county in their last election in 2014 and 2012 respectively. In 2020, Joe Biden improved upon Clinton's performance, receiving the highest vote percentage for a Democrat since Michael Dukakis in 1988 and the most votes for a Democrat since LBJ in 1964.

State representatives
Source

 Robert F. Matzie, Democratic, 16th district
 Aerion Abney, Democratic, 19th district
 Emily Kinkead, Democratic, 20th district
 Sara Innamorato, Democratic, 21st district
 Dan Frankel, Democratic, 23rd district
 Martell Covington, Democratic, 24th district
 Brandon Markosek, Democratic, 25th district
 Daniel J. Deasy, Democratic, 27th district
 Rob Mercuri, Republican, 28th district
 Lori Mizgorski, Republican, 30th district
 Anthony M. DeLuca, Democratic, 32nd district
 Carrie DelRosso, Republican, 33rd district
 Vacant, 34th district
 Austin Davis, Democratic, 35th district
 Jessica Benham, Democratic, 36th district
 Nick Pisciottano, Democratic, 38th district
 Mike Puskaric, Republican, 39th district
 Natalie Mihalek, Republican, 40th district
 Dan L. Miller, Democratic, 42nd district
 Valerie Gaydos, Republican, 44th district
 Anita Astorino Kulik, Democratic, 45th district
 Jason Ortitay, Republican, 46th district
 Bob Brooks, Republican, 54th district

State senators

 Devlin Robinson, Republican, 37th district
 Lindsey Williams, Democrat, 38th district
 Wayne D. Fontana, Democrat, 42nd district
 Jay Costa, Democrat, 43rd district
 James Brewster, Democrat, 45th district

U.S. representatives
 Chris Deluzio, Democrat, 17th district
 Summer Lee, Democrat, 12th district

United States Senate
John Fetterman, Democrat
Bob Casey, Democrat

Religion 
In 2010 statistics, the largest religious group in Allegheny County was the Diocese of Pittsburgh, with 460,672 Catholics worshipping at 179 parishes, followed by 44,204 UMC Methodists with 100 congregations, 42,838 PC-USA Presbyterians with 145 congregations, 33,103 non-denominational adherents with 85 congregations, 24,718 ELCA Lutherans with 77 congregations, 17,148 ABCUSA Baptists with 42 congregations, 12,398 AoG Pentecostals with 30 congregations, 8,483 Reform Jews with 6 congregations, 7,780 TEC Episcopalians with 19 congregations, and 6,700 Hindus with four temples. Altogether, 60.6% of the population was claimed as members by religious congregations, although members of historically African-American denominations were underrepresented due to incomplete information. In 2014, Allegheny County had 794 religious organizations, the 11th most out of all US counties.

Demographics

As of the 2010 census, there were 1,223,348 people living in the county. The population density was 1676 people per square mile (647/km2). The racial makeup of the county was 82.87% White, 14.39% Black or African American, 2.94% Asian, 0.03% Pacific Islander, 0.37% from other races, and 1.40% from two or more races. About 1.31% of the population were Hispanic or Latino of any race.

At the census of 2000, there were 1,281,666 people, 537,150 households, and 332,495 families living in the county. The population density was 1,755 people per square mile (678/km2). There were 583,646 housing units at an average density of 799 per square mile (309/km2). The racial makeup of the county was 84.33% White, 12.41% Black or African American, 0.12% Native American, 1.69% Asian, 0.03% Pacific Islander, 0.34% from other races, and 1.07% from two or more races. About 0.87% of the population were Hispanic or Latino of any race. 20.0% were of German, 15.0% Italian, 12.7% Irish, 7.5% Polish and 5.1% English ancestry according to Census 2000. 93.5% spoke English and 1.3% Spanish as their first language.

There were 537,150 households, out of which 26.40% had children under the age of 18 living with them, 46.10% were married couples living together, 12.40% had a female householder with no husband present, and 38.10% were non-families. Some 32.70% of all households were made up of individuals, and 13.20% had someone living alone who was 65 years of age or older. The average household size was 2.31 and the average family size was 2.96.

The age distribution of the population shows 21.90% under the age of 18, 8.50% from 18 to 24, 28.30% from 25 to 44, 23.40% from 45 to 64, and 17.80% who were 65 years of age or older. The median age was 40. For every 100 females, there were 90.00 males; for every 100 females age 18 and over, there were 86.20 males.

2020 Census

Economy

In the late 18th century, farming played a critical role in the growth of the area. There was a surplus of grain due to transportation difficulties in linking with the eastern portion of the state. As a result, the farmers distilled the grain into whiskey, which significantly helped the farmers financially.

The area quickly became a key manufacturing area in the young nation. Coupled with deposits of iron and coal, and the easy access to waterways for barge traffic, the city quickly became one of the most important steel producing areas in the world.  Based on 2007 data from the US Army Corps of Engineers, Pittsburgh is the second (after Laredo, Texas) busiest inland port in the nation.

US steel production declined late in the 20th century, and Allegheny County's economy began a shift to other industries. It is presently known for its hospitals, universities, and industrial centers. Despite the decline of heavy industry, Pittsburgh is home to a number of major companies and is ranked in the top ten among US cities hosting headquarters of Fortune 500 corporations, including U.S. Steel Corporation, PNC Financial Services Group, PPG Industries, and H. J. Heinz Company.

The county leads the state in number of defense contractors supplying the U.S. military.

Regions

 East Hills
 North Hills
 South Hills
 West Hills
 City of Pittsburgh

Education

Colleges and universities

 Byzantine Catholic Seminary of SS. Cyril and Methodius
 Carlow University
 Carnegie Mellon University
 Chatham University
 DeVry University
 Duquesne University
 La Roche College
 Penn State Greater Allegheny
 Pittsburgh Theological Seminary
 Point Park University
 Reformed Presbyterian Theological Seminary
 Robert Morris University
 University of Pittsburgh

Community, junior and technical colleges

 Bidwell Training Center
 Community College of Allegheny County
 Empire Beauty Schools
 Fountain of Youth Academy of Cosmetology
 Institute of Medical and Business Careers
 North Hills Beauty Academy
 Pittsburgh Career Institute
 Pittsburgh Institute of Aeronautics
 Pittsburgh Institute of Mortuary Science
 Pittsburgh Multicultural Cosmetology Academy
 Pittsburgh Technical College
 Rosedale Technical College
 South Hills Beauty Academy
 Triangle Tech
 Vet Tech Institute

Public school districts

School districts include:

Approved private schools
These private schools provide special education for disabled students:
 ACLD Tillotson School, Pittsburgh
 The Day School at The Children's Institute, Pittsburgh
 DePaul School for Hearing and Speech, Pittsburgh
 Easter Seal Society of Western Pennsylvania
 The Education Center at the Watson Institute, Sewickley
 Pace School, Pittsburgh
 Pressley Ridge Day School, Pittsburgh
 Pressley Ridge School for the Deaf, Pittsburgh
 The Watson Institute Friendship Academy, Pittsburgh
 Wesley Spectrum Highland Services, Pittsburgh
 Western Pennsylvania School for Blind Children, Pittsburgh
 Western Pennsylvania School for the Deaf, Pittsburgh

Private high schools

 Bishop Canevin High School
 Central Catholic High School
 Cornerstone Christian Preparatory Academy
 Eden Christian Academy
 The Ellis School
 Hillcrest Christian Academy
 Harvest Baptist Academy 
 Imani Christian Academy
 Oakland Catholic High School
 Our Lady of the Sacred Heart High School
 Serra Catholic High School
 Seton-La Salle Catholic High School
 Sewickley Academy
 Shady Side Academy
 St. Joseph High School
 Vincentian Academy
 Winchester Thurston School

Transportation
Allegheny County's public transportation provider is  Pittsburgh Regional Transit. The Allegheny County Department of Public Works oversees infrastructure, maintenance, and engineering services in the county.

The Three Rivers Heritage Trail provides uninterrupted bicycle and pedestrian connections along the three rivers in the city, and the Great Allegheny Passage trail runs from downtown Pittsburgh to Washington, D.C.

The Allegheny County Airport is the original airport for Pittsburgh and houses a number of flight schools, charter flight operations, and medevac operations.

Major roadways
  Interstate 79 runs north to south from Warrendale to Bridgeville
  Interstate 279 runs north to south from Franklin Park to Downtown
  Interstate 579 (Crosstown Boulevard), from Interstate 279 on the north shore to Liberty Bridge / Boulevard of the Allies
   Interstate 76 / PA Turnpike runs east to west from Interstate 376 in Monroeville to the Warrendale interchange (at Interstate 79)
  Interstate 376 runs east to west from Interstate 76 in Monroeville across the county to Pittsburgh International Airport and beyond
  Pennsylvania Turnpike 576 (future I-576) runs south from Interstate 376 at the Pittsburgh International Airport to US Route 22, also called the Findlay Connector. The next phase of this road extension, from US Route 22 to Interstate 79 running along the County line, is currently under construction and is expected to be open to traffic in 2020.
  US Route 19 runs north to south from Warrendale to Upper St. Clair
  US Route 22 runs west to east, along much of US Route 30 and Interstate 376, from Imperial to Monroeville
  US Route 30 runs west to east from Clinton to North Versailles, joining US 22 and Interstate 376 south of the Pittsburgh International Airport and leaving those same two routes in Wilkinsburg

For information about major state roads, see list of State Routes in Allegheny County, Pennsylvania and Allegheny County Belt System.

Parks and recreation
There are two Pennsylvania state parks in Allegheny County. Point State Park is at the confluence of the Allegheny and Monongahela rivers in Downtown Pittsburgh, and Allegheny Islands State Park is in the Allegheny River in Harmar Township and is undeveloped as of August 2010.

Pennsylvania State Game Lands Number 203 is also located in Allegheny County providing hunting and other activities.

Sports
 Pittsburgh Steelers, football team
 Pittsburgh Penguins, ice hockey team
 Pittsburgh Pirates, baseball team
 Pittsburgh Riverhounds, soccer team
 Pittsburgh Passion, Women's Football Alliance team
 Pittsburgh Thunderbirds, American Ultimate Disc League team
 Steel City Roller Derby, Women's Flat Track Derby Association team

Communities

Under Pennsylvania law, there are four types of incorporated municipalities: cities, boroughs, townships, and (in one case) a town. The following municipalities are in Allegheny County:

Cities
 Clairton
 Duquesne
 McKeesport
 Pittsburgh (county seat)

Boroughs

 Aspinwall
 Avalon
 Baldwin
 Bell Acres
 Bellevue
 Ben Avon
 Ben Avon Heights
 Bethel Park
 Blawnox
 Brackenridge
 Braddock
 Braddock Hills
 Bradford Woods
 Brentwood
 Bridgeville
 Carnegie
 Castle Shannon
 Chalfant
 Cheswick
 Churchill
 Coraopolis
 Crafton
 Dormont
 Dravosburg
 East McKeesport
 East Pittsburgh
 Edgewood
 Edgeworth
 Elizabeth
 Emsworth
 Etna
 Forest Hills
 Fox Chapel
 Franklin Park
 Glassport
 Glen Osborne
 Glenfield
 Green Tree
 Haysville
 Heidelberg
 Homestead
 Ingram
 Jefferson Hills
 Leetsdale
 Liberty
 Lincoln
 McDonald (mostly in Washington County)
 McKees Rocks
 Millvale
 Monroeville
 Mount Oliver
 Munhall
 North Braddock
 Oakdale
 Oakmont
 Pennsbury Village
 Pitcairn
 Pleasant Hills
 Plum
 Port Vue
 Rankin
 Rosslyn Farms
 Sewickley
 Sewickley Heights
 Sewickley Hills
 Sharpsburg
 Springdale
 Swissvale
 Tarentum
 Thornburg
 Trafford (mostly in Westmoreland County)
 Turtle Creek
 Verona
 Versailles
 Wall
 West Elizabeth
 West Homestead
 West Mifflin
 West View
 Whitaker
 White Oak
 Whitehall
 Wilkinsburg
 Wilmerding

Townships

 Aleppo
 Baldwin
 Collier
 Crescent
 East Deer
 Elizabeth
 Fawn
 Findlay
 Forward
 Frazer
 Hampton
 Harmar
 Harrison
 Indiana
 Kennedy
 Kilbuck
 Leet
 Marshall
 McCandless
 Moon
 Mt. Lebanon
 Neville
 North Fayette
 North Versailles
 O'Hara
 Ohio
 Penn Hills
 Pine
 Reserve
 Richland
 Robinson
 Ross
 Scott
 Shaler
 South Fayette
 South Park
 South Versailles
 Springdale
 Stowe
 Upper Saint Clair
 West Deer
 Wilkins

Census-designated places
Census-designated places are geographical areas designated by the US Census Bureau for the purposes of compiling demographic data. They are not actual jurisdictions under Pennsylvania law. Other unincorporated communities, such as villages, may be listed here as well.

 Allison Park
 Bairdford
 Bakerstown
 Boston
 Carnot-Moon
 Clinton
 Curtisville
 Enlow
 Gibsonia
 Glenshaw
 Greenock
 Harwick
 Imperial
 Noblestown
 Rennerdale
 Russellton
 Sturgeon

Unincorporated communities

 Acmetonia
 Blackridge
 Blanchard
 Broughton
 Bruceton
 Buena Vista
 Creighton
 Cubbage Hill
 Cuddy
 Dorseyville
 Ewingsville
 Harmarville
 Indianola
 Ingomar
 Karns
 Keown Station
 Kirwan Heights
 Library
 McKnight
 Moon Run
 Mount Vernon
 Natrona
 Natrona Heights
 Nevillewood
 Presto
 Regent Square
 Rural Ridge
 Sheraden
 Warrendale
 Wexford
 Wildwood

Former places
Many political subdivisions of Allegheny County have come and gone through subdivision or annexation through the years. These include:
 Allegheny City – the area that is now the North Shore (or North Side) of the City of Pittsburgh, north of the Allegheny River.
 Allentown Borough – now the neighborhood of Allentown in Pittsburgh.
 Birmingham Borough – what is now Pittsburgh's South Side.
 Brushton Borough
 Carrick Borough – now the neighborhood of Carrick. Formed out of Baldwin Township in 1904, this borough existed until it was annexed by Pittsburgh in 1927. It was named for Carrick-on-Suir, Ireland. Some of the area's manhole covers still bear the Carrick Borough name.
 Chartier Township – existed at the time of the 1860 U.S. Federal Census.
 Collins Township – in what is now the northeast part of the City of Pittsburgh, east of Lawrenceville and north of Penn Avenue.
 Knoxville Borough
 Lawrenceville Borough
 McClure Township – McClure was formed in 1858 from the section of Ross Township adjacent to Allegheny City. In 1867 McClure, along with sections of Reserve Township, was incorporated into Allegheny City. The McClure section of this annexation became Wards 9 (Woods Run Area) and 11 (present-day Brighton Heights) in the City of Pittsburgh.
 Mifflin Township- comprised the modern day communities of Whitaker, West Mifflin, West Homestead, West Elizabeth, Pleasant Hills, Munhall, Lincoln Place, Jefferson Hills, Homestead, Hays, Duquesne, Dravosburg, Clairton and part of Baldwin.
 Patton Township – was in the east-central part of the county, north of North Versailles Township, east of Wilkins and Penn Townships, and south of Plum Township. In the U.S. census for 1860–1880. In 1951 it became incorporated as the borough of Monroeville.
 Northern Liberties Borough – in what is now the Strip District of Pittsburgh. The borough was annexed to Pittsburgh in 1837 as the first addition to the city's original territory.
 Peebles Township – included most of what is now the eastern part of the city of Pittsburgh from the Monongahela River in the south (today's Hazelwood) to the Allegheny River in the north. It was subdivided into Collins and Liberty townships, all of which were incorporated into Pittsburgh in 1868.
 Pitt Township
 St. Clair Township – stretched from the Monongahela River south to the Washington County line. It divided into Lower St. Clair, which eventually became part of the City of Pittsburgh, Dormont, Mount Lebanon, and Upper St. Clair.
 Snowden – now known as South Park Township.
 Sterrett Township
 Temperanceville – what is now Pittsburgh's West End.
 Union Borough – the area surrounding Temperanceville.
 West Liberty Borough – now the neighborhoods of Brookline and Beechview in Pittsburgh.

Population ranking
The population ranking of the following table is based on the 2010 census of Allegheny County.

† county seat

See also
 List of Pennsylvania state historical markers in Allegheny County
 National Register of Historic Places listings in Allegheny County, Pennsylvania
List of counties in Pennsylvania

Notes

References

External links

 Allegheny County official website
 Allegheny County Quest
 County Map by Municipality
 Historic Pittsburgh Map Collection
 Southwestern Pennsylvania Commission

1788 establishments in Pennsylvania
 
Counties of Appalachia
Pennsylvania counties on the Ohio River
Pennsylvania placenames of Native American origin
Pittsburgh metropolitan area
Populated places established in 1788